Oh Yong-Geun is a mathematician and distinguished professor at the Pohang University of Science and Technology and founding director of the IBS Center for Geometry and Physics located on that campus. His fields of study have been on symplectic topology, Floer homology, Hamiltonian mechanics, and mirror symmetry He was in the inaugural class of fellows of the American Mathematical Society and has been a member of Institute for Advanced Study, Korean Mathematical Society, and National Academy of Sciences of the Republic of Korea and is on the editorial boards of Journal of Gokova Geometry and Topology and Journal of Mathematics of Kyoto University.

Education
Oh went to Seoul National University and received a B.A in Math in 1983. He then went to U.C. Berkeley, where he majored in Mathematics and his Ph.D. was conferred in 1988. His dissertation research was supervised by Professor Alan Weinstein. With the completion of his PhD, he then focused on developing and enhancing the Floer homology theory in symplectic geometry and its application within that field.

Career
His career started during his Ph.D. program, where he worked as a teaching assistant and then research assistant in the Department of Math at U.C. Berkeley. After graduation, he was a post-doctoral research fellow at the Mathematical Sciences Research Institute, located in Berkeley. He then moved to New York to work as a Courant Instructor at the Courant Institute of Mathematical Sciences for a year. Going to the Department of Mathematics in the University of Wisconsin–Madison, he started as an assistant professor in 1991, associate professor in 1997, and full professor in 2001. During his sabbatical, he was a visiting professor at Stanford University for the academic year 2004–2005.

While teaching at the University of Wisconsin–Madison, he also was a member of the Institute for Advanced Study in Princeton, a research member at the Isaac Newton Institute in the University of Cambridge, visiting professor at the Research Institute for Mathematical Sciences in Kyoto University, and a professor at the Korea Institute for Advanced Study. He became a distinguished professor at the Pohang University of Science and Technology (POSTECH) in 2010 and the founding director of the Institute for Basic Science Center for Geometry and Physics in 2012, which is located on the POSTECH campus.

Memberships
 2014: Member of Korean Academy of Science and Technology
 2013: Inaugural Class of Fellows, American Mathematical Society
 1991-1992: Institute for Advanced Study
 Korean Mathematical Society
 National Academy of Sciences of the Republic of Korea

Editorial boards
 2007–current: Journal of Gokova Geometry and Topology
 2009–current: Journal of Mathematics of Kyoto University

Awards
 2022: Ho-Am Prize in Science
 2019: Korea Science Award
 2012: Kyung-Ahm Prize
 2002: Vilas Associate Award, University of Wisconsin
 2001: Young Scientist Award, Korean Academy of Science and Technology
 1988: Bernard Friedman memorial prize in Applied Mathematics

Selected publications

References

External links
 Center for Geometry and Physics

Institute for Advanced Study people
Fellows of the American Mathematical Society
Academic staff of Pohang University of Science and Technology
Seoul National University alumni
University of California, Berkeley alumni
21st-century South Korean mathematicians
Institute for Basic Science
1961 births
Living people
Recipients of the Ho-Am Prize in Science
20th-century South Korean mathematicians
South Korean scientists